Moran Township is a civil township of Mackinac County in the U.S. state of Michigan. The population was 994 at the 2010 census.

Communities
The community is not a part of Brevort Township, which is adjacent to Moran Township on the north and east.
 Gros Cap is an unincorporated community in the township on Lake Michigan, approximately five miles west of St. Ignace at 
It was the site for the charcoal kilns of the Martel Furnace Company and was a flag stop named "Johnson's" on the Duluth, South Shore and Atlantic Railway in 1882. A post office named Ozark operated from June 1884 until August 1966. The name was derived from the early French name for the place Aux Arc, meaning "at the bend."

Geography

Attractions
 Father Marquette National Memorial
 Fred Dye Nature Sanctuary
 Hiawatha National Forest (part)
 North Country Trail (segment) 
 St. Helena Island

Demographics
As of the census of 2000, there were 1,080 people, 454 households, and 310 families residing in the township.  The population density was 8.5 per square mile (3.3/km).  There were 739 housing units at an average density of 5.8 per square mile (2.2/km).  The racial makeup of the township was 76.20% White, 0.46% African American, 14.17% Native American, 0.28% Asian, 0.09% Pacific Islander, 0.28% from other races, and 8.52% from two or more races. Hispanic or Latino of any race were 1.11% of the population.

There were 454 households, out of which 28.4% had children under the age of 18 living with them, 55.9% were married couples living together, 7.7% had a female householder with no husband present, and 31.7% were non-families. 26.0% of all households were made up of individuals, and 10.6% had someone living alone who was 65 years of age or older.  The average household size was 2.37 and the average family size was 2.82.

In the township the population was spread out, with 23.4% under the age of 18, 5.3% from 18 to 24, 26.4% from 25 to 44, 28.2% from 45 to 64, and 16.7% who were 65 years of age or older.  The median age was 43 years. For every 100 females, there were 101.5 males.  For every 100 females age 18 and over, there were 99.8 males.

The median income for a household in the township was $40,208, and the median income for a family was $48,750. Males had a median income of $37,188 versus $24,219 for females. The per capita income for the township was $19,209.  About 3.3% of families and 6.9% of the population were below the poverty line, including 4.1% of those under age 18 and 2.5% of those age 65 or over.

References

Townships in Mackinac County, Michigan
Townships in Michigan
Populated places established in 1844
1844 establishments in Michigan
Michigan populated places on Lake Michigan